Farley may refer to:

People
 Farley (name)

Places

Antarctica
 Mount Farley
 Farley Massif

Australia
 Farley, New South Wales
 Farley railway station

England
 Farley, Derbyshire
 Farley, Staffordshire
 Farley, Surrey
 Farley, Wiltshire

United States
 Farley, California
 Farley, Iowa
 Farley, Kentucky
 Farley, Missouri
 Farley, West Virginia
 Farley Township, Polk County, Minnesota
 Farley Hall (University of Notre Dame)
 Farley (Culpeper County, Virginia)
 Joseph M. Farley Nuclear Plant
 James A. Farley Building

Arts and entertainment
 Farley (comic strip), a comic strip by Phil Frank in the San Francisco Chronicle
 Farley (Sesame Street), in Sesame Street
 Farley, a sheepdog in the comic strip For Better or For Worse

Businesses
 Farley's, British food maker, now owned by Heinz
 Farley's & Sathers Candy Company, British confectionery maker, now owned by Ferrero Group
 Farley Boats, Texan boat manufacturer, retired in the mid-1970s
 Farley Industries, American private equity firm

See also 
 
 Farley Castle, Berkshire
 Farley Hill (disambiguation)
 Farley file, a political data collection practice